is a railway station in the city of Mutsu, Aomori Prefecture, Japan, operated by East Japan Railway Company (JR East). It was formerly also the terminal station for the Shimokita Kōtsu Company's , which closed in 2001 and was replaced by a bus line.

Lines
Shimokita Station is served by the Ōminato Line, and is located 55.5 kilometers from the terminus of the Ōminato Line at Noheji Station.

Station layout
The station has one ground-level island platform, of which only one side is in use, serving bidirectional traffic. The other side of the platform was formerly used for the now-defunct Ōhata Line. The station building is attended, and has a Midori no Madoguchi staffed ticket office as well as an automatic ticket machine.

History
Shimokita Station opened on December 6, 1939 as a station on the Japanese Government Railways (JGR). All freight operations were discontinued as of December 1, 1983. With the privatization of Japanese National Railways (JNR) on April 1, 1987, it came under the operational control of JR East. The station building was completely rebuilt in 2009.

Passenger statistics
In fiscal 2018, the station was used by an average of 193 passengers daily (boarding passengers only).

Surrounding area
Mutsu City Hall
Mutsu City Library
Mutsu Post Office
Mutsu General Hospital

See also
 List of railway stations in Japan

References

External links

  

Railway stations in Aomori Prefecture
Ōminato Line
Railway stations in Japan opened in 1939
Mutsu, Aomori